The following is a list of episodes from the series Nature Cat.

Series overview

Episodes

Season 1 (2015–17)

Season 2 (2018–19)

Season 3 (2019–21)

Special (2019)

Season 4 (2022)

Season 5

References

External links

Lists of American children's animated television series episodes
Lists of Canadian children's animated television series episodes